The Judge J. Frank Graff Bridge is a truss bridge that carries U.S. Route 422 (US 422) and Pennsylvania Route 28 (PA 28) across the Allegheny River. It connects Manor Township and North Buffalo Township, Pennsylvania. It was constructed in 1974 as part of a freeway bypass of Kittanning, Pennsylvania. The structure is named for Frank Graff, an Armstrong County Court of Common Pleas Judge who later rose to become a member of the Pennsylvania Superior Court.

See also
 
 
 
 List of crossings of the Allegheny River

References
National Bridges Article
Frank Graff info

Bridges over the Allegheny River
Truss bridges in the United States
Bridges completed in 1974
Kittanning, Pennsylvania
Bridges in Armstrong County, Pennsylvania
Road bridges in Pennsylvania
Bridges of the United States Numbered Highway System
U.S. Route 22
1974 establishments in Pennsylvania